Household Gods is a 1999 science fiction time-travel novel written by Harry Turtledove and Judith Tarr.

Plot summary
The story focuses on Nicole Gunther-Perrin,  a young lawyer in late 20th-century Los Angeles who is dissatisfied with her hectic life, which includes balancing her career with being a mother and dealing with her deadbeat ex-husband and sexist coworkers. Believing the past to be a better time, one evening after a particularly distressing day, she makes a wistful plea to a plaque of two Roman gods, Liber and Libera, who take it as a prayer. Unknown to her, the plaque, which she thinks is a tourist copy picked up in Europe on holidays on a trip a few years earlier, is actually an ancient relic from the Roman Era. The next morning, she finds herself waking up in the body of one of her ancient ancestors running a tavern in the 2nd century Carnuntum, in what is now Austria.

In general, she finds out the hard way that life in the past was not quite what she thought it would be:  slavery is taken for granted, and there are no women's rights, no effective medicine or clean medical practices, little entertainment, and no tampons. Over the course of a year and a half, she is forced to revise many of her long-held modern prejudices, including those against alcohol and corporal punishment.

She survives epidemic disease (the Antonine Plague) and a Germanic invasion that is part of the Marcomannic Wars. She finds that early Christianity was uncomfortably zealous and apocalyptic. Having managed to ving avoided rape during the occupation of the city by Germanic "barbarians", she experiences a brutal rape by one of the Roman soldiers who came to liberate the city. Afterwards, she discusses the role of government and its duties to abused citizens with Roman Emperor Marcus Aurelius who headed personally the Roman military force arriving at Carnuntum.

Eventually, Liber and Libera fulfill her desire to return home. She wakes from a six-day 'coma' to discover that she can improve both her working and family life. Not only have her hard-won skills given her more empathy and self-confidence, but also she now has greater appreciation for the life that modern conveniences allow. With her new perspective, she can more easily and successfully deal with the stress and difficulties of her existence.

Critical reactions
Jo Walton remarked, "Household Gods is a well-written book that always annoys the heck out of me.... Nicole Gunther-Perrin is a lawyer in Los Angeles, and she’s the most irritating person you could ever spend a whole book with.... she's had this marvellous opportunity and there she is so passive and ignorant that I want to kick her out of the way and do it myself and prove that women can be Martin Padway and not all Nicole Gunther-Perrin. (Also, I have had headlice. They're not that bad.)"

References
		

Novels about time travel
1999 American novels
Collaborative novels
Novels by Harry Turtledove
1999 science fiction novels
Novels set in ancient Rome